Hugh Matheson may refer to:

Hugh Matheson (rower) (born 1949), British Olympic rower in the 1970s and '80s
Hugh Matheson (industrialist) (died 1898), British industrialist